Grandmother Gap (el. ) is a mountain pass in North Carolina on the Blue Ridge Parkway, between Grandmother Mountain and Beacon Heights, east of Linville and nearby Grandfather Mountain.

References

Landforms of Avery County, North Carolina
Transportation in Avery County, North Carolina
Mountain passes of North Carolina
Blue Ridge Parkway